In trigonometry, the law of tangents is a statement about the relationship between the tangents of two angles of a triangle and the lengths of the opposing sides.

The law of tangents states that

The law of tangents, although not as commonly known as the law of sines or the law of cosines, is equivalent to the law of sines, and can be used in any case where two sides and the included angle, or two angles and a side, are known.

Proof
To prove the law of tangents one can start with the law of sines:

 

Let

 

so that

 

It follows that

 

Using the trigonometric identity, the factor formula for sines specifically

 

we get

As an alternative to using the identity for the sum or difference of two sines, one may cite the trigonometric identity

 

(see tangent half-angle formula).

Application

From 

In the time before electronic calculators were available, this method
was preferable to an application of  the law of cosines , as this latter law necessitated an additional lookup in a logarithm table, in order to compute the square root.

Spherical version 

On a sphere of unit radius, the sides of the triangle are arcs of great circles. Accordingly, their lengths can be expressed in radians or any other units of angular measure. The spherical law of tangents says

History

The law of tangents for planar triangles was described in the 11th century by Ibn Muʿādh al-Jayyānī.

The law of tangents for spherical triangles was described in the 13th century by Persian mathematician Nasir al-Din al-Tusi (1201–1274), who also presented the law of sines for plane triangles in his five-volume work Treatise on the Quadrilateral.

See also
 Law of sines
 Law of cosines
 Law of cotangents
 Mollweide's formula
 Half-side formula
 Tangent half-angle formula

Notes 

Trigonometry
Articles containing proofs
Theorems about triangles